Robert Marshall Blount Fulford  (born February 13, 1932) is a Canadian journalist, magazine editor, and essayist. He lives in Toronto, Ontario.

Personal life
Fulford was born in Ottawa, Ontario to Frances (Blount) Fulford and A. E. Fulford, a journalist and editor at Canadian Press. He grew up in The Beaches neighbourhood in Toronto and was a childhood friend of Glenn Gould. He is married to writer and producer Geraldine Sherman, with whom he has two daughters. His daughter Sarah became editor-in-chief of Maclean's magazine in February 2022, after serving as editor-in-chief of "Toronto Life" magazine for 14 years.

Career
Fulford's media career began at the age of 16, while still in high school, when he worked for Toronto radio station CHUM reporting on high school sports and producing a weekly radio show for teenagers. 

In the summer of 1950, Fulford left high school and went to work for The Globe and Mail as a sports reporter. Subsequently, Fulford rose to various editorial positions at the newspaper before moving to The Toronto Star as a columnist (1959–1962, 1964–1968 and 1971–1987). From 1963 to 1964 he was a columnist and editor of the Reviews section at Maclean's magazine before returning to the Star. He covered Expo 67 for the newspaper and wrote a book on the world's fair, This Was Expo. 

From 1968 until 1987, Fulford was the editor of Saturday Night magazine and also wrote both a general column for the magazine under his own name, and film reviews under the pseudonym "Marshall Delaney". He then worked as a columnist for the Financial Times of Canada (1988–1992), The Globe and Mail (1992–1999) and the National Post (1999–2019) 

Fulford worked as the co-host with Richard Gwyn of  Realities, a long-form interview show on TVOntario (1982–1989) and as a regular panelist on CBC Radio's Morningside (1989–1993). In 1999, he delivered the Massey Lecture. In 1984, Fulford was awarded the honour of Officer of the Order of Canada.

In his 1988 entry for The Canadian Encyclopedia, Douglas Fetherling described Fulford's politics as being on "the more conservative end of the liberal spectrum".

Fulford is also a critic of literature, art and films. He has written extensively about the Canadian abstract art group Painters Eleven, its members (particularly William Ronald, Tom Hodgson, and Harold Town), and the Saskatchewan abstract artist Mashel Teitelbaum.

Selected bibliography 
 This Was Expo - 1968
 Crisis at the Victory Burlesk: Culture, Politics and Other Diversions - 1968
 Harold Town Drawings - 1968 (editor)
 Marshall Delaney at the Movies - 1974
 An Introduction to the Arts in Canada - 1977
 Canada: A Celebration - 1983
 Best Seat in the House: Memoirs of a Lucky Man - 1988
 Accidental City: The Transformation of Toronto - 1995
 Toronto Discovered - 1998
 The Triumph of Narrative: Storytelling in the Age of Mass Culture - 1999

See also
 List of newspaper columnists

Notes

External links

1932 births
Living people
Canadian art critics
Canadian columnists
Canadian male essayists
Canadian social commentators
Journalists from Ontario
Officers of the Order of Canada
The Globe and Mail columnists
Toronto Star people
Maclean's writers and editors
National Post people
Canadian magazine editors
Canadian male journalists
Canadian theatre critics
Writers from Ottawa
20th-century Canadian essayists
20th-century Canadian male writers
21st-century Canadian essayists
21st-century Canadian male writers
Saturday Night (magazine) editors